Legends Cup could refer to:

Legends Cup (LFL), the championship game of the Legends Football League (formerly Lingerie Football League)
Legends Cup (Russia), annual Russian football tournament for senior retired football players